The militants fatality reports are the official reports and battle logs gathered and published by the Ministry of Defence on the accounts of the rate of human casualties suffered by the Taliban in the frontier war since 2005. Reports are based on the official ISPR accounts and news media sources in Khyber Pakhtunkhwa and FATA.

This article incorporates yearly numbers of militant fatalities. Details on the numbers of killed in some major battles and operations are also provided.

Totals
At least 28,907 militants (total casualties: 43,346+) have been reportedly killed so far (from January 2005 to present). This figure was updated, adding those counted by the South Asia Terrorism Portal but only concerning FATA and Khyber Pakhtunkhwa and not the whole regions of the country.

References

External links 
 South Asia Terrorism Portal

History of Pakistan
Pakistan-related lists
Reports of the Government of Pakistan
Fatality Reports In Pakistan
Insurgency in Khyber Pakhtunkhwa